Ahmad Abdelhay Eissa (Arabic:أحمد عبد الحي عيسى) (born 20 March 1997) is a Qatari born-Egyptian footballer. He currently plays as a right back for Smouha .

Career
Ahmad Abdelhay started his career at Al-Kharaitiyat and is a product of the Al-Kharaitiyat's youth system. On 15 September 2017, Ahmad Abdelhay made his professional debut for Al-Kharaitiyat against Umm Salal in the Pro League .

External links

References

Living people
1997 births
Qatari footballers
Egyptian footballers
Qatari people of Egyptian descent
Naturalised citizens of Qatar
Al Kharaitiyat SC players
Smouha SC players
Qatar Stars League players
Qatari Second Division players
Egyptian Premier League players
Association football fullbacks
Place of birth missing (living people)